Krystian Zimerman (born 5 December 1956) is a Polish-Swiss concert pianist, conductor and pedagogue who has been described as one of the greatest pianists of his generation. In 1975, he won the IX International Chopin Piano Competition.

Following the success at the Chopin Piano Competition, he began his collaboration with the Berlin Philharmonic and has since performed with leading orchestras around the world as well as many prominent conductors such as Leonard Bernstein, Pierre Boulez, Herbert von Karajan, Claudio Abbado and Simon Rattle. He is especially known for his performances of compositions by Mozart, Chopin, Brahms and Beethoven. He is also the recipient of many awards and honours including Léonie Sonning Music Prize (1994), Legion of Honour (2005), Order of Polonia Restituta (2013) and Praemium Imperiale (2022).

Biography
Zimerman was born in Zabrze, Southern Poland, and started to play the piano at the age of five encouraged by his father, who was also a pianist. He studied at the Karol Szymanowski Academy of Music in Katowice under Andrzej Jasiński. In 1973, he won top prize at the Ludwig van Beethoven International Piano Competition in Hradec Kralove, Czechoslovakia. His international career was launched when he won the 1975 Warsaw International Chopin Piano Competition. He performed with the Berlin Philharmonic in 1976, conducted by Herbert Blomstedt. He debuted in the United States with the New York Philharmonic in 1979. He has toured widely and made a number of recordings. Since 1996, he has taught piano at the Music Academy in Basel, Switzerland. In 1999, Zimerman created the Polish Festival Orchestra to commemorate the 150th anniversary of Frédéric Chopin's death.

Zimerman is best known for his interpretations of Romantic music, but has performed a wide variety of classical pieces and is a supporter of contemporary music. Witold Lutosławski wrote his Piano Concerto for Zimerman, who has recorded it twice. Among his best-known recordings are the concerti of Grieg and Schumann with Herbert von Karajan; the Brahms concerti with Leonard Bernstein; the piano concerti of Chopin, one recording conducted by Carlo Maria Giulini and a later one conducted by himself at the keyboard; the Third, Fourth and Fifth Piano Concertos of Beethoven under Bernstein (Zimerman himself led the Vienna Philharmonic from the keyboard in Beethoven's First and Second Concertos); the first and second piano concerti of Rachmaninoff; the piano concerti of Liszt with Seiji Ozawa, the piano concerti of Ravel with Pierre Boulez, and solo piano works by Chopin, Liszt (including one of the most virtuosic performances of the famous Piano Sonata in B minor), Debussy and Schubert. In 2006, Zimerman recorded Brahms' Piano Concerto No. 1 with the Berlin Philharmonic conducted by Sir Simon Rattle (DG 477 5413; Limited Edition DG 477 6021).

Zimerman has collaborated with conductors and artists such as Claudio Abbado, Daniel Barenboim, Leonard Bernstein, Pierre Boulez, Charles Dutoit, Carlo Maria Giulini, Bernard Haitink, Herbert von Karajan, Kirill Kondrashin, Erich Leinsdorf, Lorin Maazel, Zubin Mehta, Riccardo Muti, Seiji Ozawa, Simon Rattle, Esa-Pekka Salonen, Giuseppe Sinopoli, Stanisław Skrowaczewski and Wolfgang Sawallisch.

Criticism of US policy
On 26 April 2009, Zimerman vowed to his audience at Los Angeles's Walt Disney Concert Hall that, in protest at America's placement of a missile defense shield in Poland, this would be his final appearance in the United States. He had made a similar comment in 2006, stating he would not return until George W. Bush was out of office.  he has not made any further appearances in the United States.
Part of his disenchantment with the USA may be the increased security at US airports, which makes it difficult to bring his piano into the country. In incidents in 2001 and 2006, one of his Steinway pianos was completely destroyed and another one damaged by security staff at New York JFK airport.

Personal life
In 1981, Zimerman moved to Röschenz in the canton of Basel-Landschaft, Switzerland, where he also became a Swiss citizen with Röschenz as his place of origin. According to conflicting sources, he's still living in Röschenz, or in Binningen, also near Basel. He married Maria (née Drygajło), a violinist, with whom he has two children: Klaudia and Ryszard. He divides his time among family, concerts, and performances of chamber music. Zimerman is also known as an editor of the piano music of Władysław Szpilman for Boosey & Hawkes.

Selected awards and honours
 1st Prize at the Voivod-wide Prokofiev Competition (1974; Poland)
 1st Prize at the IX International Chopin Piano Competition (1975; Poland)
 Accademia Musicale Chigiana Award (1985; Italy)
 Léonie Sonning Music Prize (1994; Denmark)
 Honorary doctor of the Karol Szymanowski Academy of Music in Katowice (2005; Poland)
 National Order of the Legion of Honour (2005; France)
 Gold Medal for Merit to Culture – Gloria Artis (2010; Poland)
 Commander's Cross with Star of the Order of Polonia Restituta (2013; Poland)
 Diapason d'Or (2015; France)
 Honorary doctor of the Fryderyk Chopin University of Music in Warsaw (2015; Poland)
 Praemium Imperiale (2022; Japan)

Discography
Most of Zimerman's recordings have been released by Deutsche Grammophon, with which he has an exclusive lifelong contract.

Studio albums

Live albums

Video releases

See also
Arthur Rubinstein
List of Poles

References

External links

 
 Krystian Zimerman discography
 
 

1956 births
Living people
International Chopin Piano Competition winners
Musicians from Zabrze
Deutsche Grammophon artists
Polish classical pianists
Swiss classical pianists
Male classical pianists
Polish music educators
Piano pedagogues
Recipients of the Léonie Sonning Music Prize
Recipients of the Praemium Imperiale
Commanders with Star of the Order of Polonia Restituta